The Northern Tridents are a New Zealand based field hockey club, originating in the nation's northern most region. The club was established in 2020, and is one of four established to compete in Hockey New Zealand's new premier domestic competition, the Premier Hockey League.

The club unifies both men and women under one name.

The Northern Tridents competed for the first time in the inaugural season of Premier Hockey League, where the men's and women's teams finished fourth and second in their respective tournaments.

History
Along with three other teams, the Northern Tridents were founded in 2020 as part of Hockey New Zealand's development of hockey. 

The team unifies the region from Northland to Auckland. The team's name is inspired by the sweeping ocean vistas in the northern regions of New Zealand, with their namesake coming from the trident of Poseidon, the Greek God of the sea.

Teams

Men
The following players represented the men's team during the 2020 edition of the Sentinel Homes Premier Hockey League.

Richard Joyce (GK)
Angus Griffin (GK)
Ruan Bezuidenhout (GK)
Richmond Lum
Charl Ulrich
Netesh Sukha
Robert Capizzi
Xavier Guy
Samuel Houston
Mitchell Hayde
George Muir
Isaac Houlbrooke
Maxwell Rasmussen
Liam Mortimer
Sanjay Lala
Cory Bennett
Benji Edwards
Steven Edwards
Connor Greentree
Kim Kingstone
Kieran O'Connor
Matthew Symonds

Women
The following players represented the women's team during the 2020 edition of the Sentinel Homes Premier Hockey League.

Brooke Roberts (GK)
Madeleine Williamson (GK)
Ella Hyatt-Brown
Rose Tynan
Isabella Gill
Stephanie Dickins
Samantha Polovnikoff
Stacey Michelsen
Kathryn Moffitt
Clodagh McCullough
Erin Goad
Madison Doar
Kayla Reed
Elizabeth Gunson
Katie Doar
Kate Ivory
Olivia Crum
<li value=18>[[Tyler Lench]]
<li value=19>Sophie Hildesley
<li value=20>[[Kirsten Pearce]]
<li value=21>Jessica Pilmer
{{div col end}}

References
{{reflist}}

External links
[https://blacksticksnz.co.nz/wp-content/uploads/2020/10/TheTridents.pdf Northern Tridents]

[[Category:New Zealand field hockey clubs]]
[[Category:Women's field hockey teams in New Zealand]]
[[Category:Sports clubs in New Zealand]]
[[Category:Sports clubs established in 2020]]
[[Category:2020 establishments in New Zealand]]

{{Fieldhockey-team-stub}}